Pavel Benc (born 10 July 1963, in Jablonec nad Nisou) is a Czech cross-country skier who raced from 1985 to 1997. He earned a bronze medal in the 4 × 10 km relay at the 1988 Winter Olympics. His best individual Winter Olympics finish was eight in the 50 km event during the 1992 Winter Olympics. Benc's best finish was fifth in the 50 km event at the 1991 FIS Nordic World Ski Championships. His best overall finish was second in a 15 km event in 1993.

Cross-country skiing results
All results are sourced from the International Ski Federation (FIS).

Olympic Games
 1 medal – (1 bronze)

World Championships

World Cup

Season standings

Team podiums
 1 podium – (1 ) 

Note:  Until the 1994 Winter Olympics, Olympic races were included in the World Cup scoring system.

References

External links
 
  
 
 

1963 births
Living people
Czech male cross-country skiers
Czechoslovak male cross-country skiers
Cross-country skiers at the 1984 Winter Olympics
Cross-country skiers at the 1988 Winter Olympics
Cross-country skiers at the 1992 Winter Olympics
Cross-country skiers at the 1994 Winter Olympics
Olympic bronze medalists for Czechoslovakia
Olympic cross-country skiers of Czechoslovakia
Olympic cross-country skiers of the Czech Republic
Olympic medalists in cross-country skiing
Medalists at the 1988 Winter Olympics
Sportspeople from Jablonec nad Nisou